Limestone Township is a township in Jewell County, Kansas, USA.  As of the 2000 census, its population was 49.

Geography
Limestone Township covers an area of 39.44 square miles (102.14 square kilometers); of this, 0.01 square miles (0.02 square kilometers) or 0.02 percent is water.

Unincorporated towns
 Otego
(This list is based on USGS data and may include former settlements.)

Adjacent townships
 Burr Oak Township (north)
 Holmwood Township (northeast)
 Center Township (east)
 Calvin Township (southeast)
 Ionia Township (south)
 Odessa Township (southwest)
 Esbon Township (west)
 White Mound Township (northwest)

Cemeteries
The township contains two cemeteries: Lutheran and Zion.

Major highways
 U.S. Route 36
 K-28
 K-128

References
 U.S. Board on Geographic Names (GNIS)
 United States Census Bureau cartographic boundary files

External links
 US-Counties.com
 City-Data.com

Townships in Jewell County, Kansas
Townships in Kansas